Miguel Alvariño Garcia (born May 31, 1994, in As Pontes de García Rodríguez, Galicia) is an athlete from Spain, who competes in recurve archery. He found prominence as the winner of the men's individual archery competition at the inaugural European Games. At the same event, he was part of the Spanish team that won a silver medal in the team competition.

He won the gold medal in the men's individual recurve event at the 2022 European Archery Championships held in Munich, Germany. He also won the silver medal in the men's team recurve event.

References

External links
 
 
 

1994 births
Living people
Spanish male archers
Archers at the 2015 European Games
European Games medalists in archery
European Games gold medalists for Spain
European Games silver medalists for Spain
Archers at the 2016 Summer Olympics
Olympic archers of Spain
Mediterranean Games silver medalists for Spain
Mediterranean Games bronze medalists for Spain
Mediterranean Games medalists in archery
Competitors at the 2018 Mediterranean Games
Competitors at the 2022 Mediterranean Games
Archers at the 2019 European Games
Sportspeople from As Pontes de García Rodríguez
21st-century Spanish people